Sultan Ahmad Shah III Bridge or Chenor Bridge is the main bridge on Pahang River near Temerloh, Pahang, Malaysia. The 530 metre bridge is located near Chenor.

History
The bridge was constructed in 2004 and was completed in 2006. It was officially opened on 8 December 2006 by Sultan Ahmad Shah of Pahang.

See also
Sultan Ahmad Shah Bridge (Temerloh Bridge)
Sultan Ahmad Shah II Bridge (Semantan Bridge)

Bridges completed in 2006
Bridges in Pahang